Bob and John (foaled May 17, 2003 in Kentucky; died December 10, 2018 on Jeju Island, South Korea) was an American thoroughbred racehorse. He was the son of Seeking The Gold out of the mare Minister's Melody. His sire is a son of Mr. Prospector and his dam is from Deputy Minister. Bob and John was bred and raced by Stonerside Stable. He was trained by Bob Baffert and ridden by Garrett Gomez.

As a three-year-old, Bob and John was a top contender for the Kentucky Derby after winning the Sham and Wood Memorial Stakes, beating Jazil in the latter. He finished seventeenth in the Derby and eighth in the Belmont Stakes. Raced at age four in 2007, his best result was a win in the Grade III Lone Star Park Handicap.

Bob and John was retired from racing in August 2007 to stand at Pin Oak Stud near Versailles, Kentucky, but died on December 10, 2018 at Isidore Farm on the South Korean Jeju Island.

Races

References

External links
 National Thoroughbred Racing Association bio
 Bob and John's pedigree and stats

2003 racehorse births
2018 racehorse deaths
Racehorses bred in Kentucky
Racehorses trained in the United States
Thoroughbred family 21-a